Lucchini is an Italian surname. It may refer to:

People
 Alessia Lucchini (born 1978), Italian former synchronized swimmer 
 Antonio Maria Lucchini, Italian librettist
 Aurelio Lucchini, Uruguayan architectural historian
 Florian Lucchini, French football player
 Franco Lucchini, Italian World War II pilot
 Giovanni Francesco Lucchini, Italian architect
 Giuseppe Lucchini, Italian businessman
 Italia Lucchini (1918 – unknown), Italian sprinter
 Jake Lucchini (born 1995), Canadian ice hockey player 
 Leo Oswald Lucchini (1927–1991), Canadian ice hockey player
 Luigi Lucchini, Italian businessman
 Stefano Lucchini, Italian football player
 Vincenzo Lucchini (born 1925), Swiss former sports shooter

Companies
 Gruppo Lucchini, an Italian steel company
 Lucchini Engineering, an Italian sports car constructor and racing team
 Lucchini RS, an Italian company

 Fictional characters
  Francesca Lucchini in the cast of Strike Witches,  created by Humikane Shimada

Italian-language surnames
Surnames of Italian origin